Studio 54 was a nightclub at the MGM Grand in Las Vegas that opened in December 1997 and closed in February 2012.

The nightclub displayed some memorabilia from the original Studio 54, including photos of celebrities at the New York City nightclub.

It was visited on opening night by Elton John, one of the most frequent guests at the original location.

The venue is mentioned in the song Vegas Two Times by the Stereophonics.

References

Defunct nightclubs in the Las Vegas Valley
Event venues established in 1997
1997 establishments in Nevada
2012 disestablishments in Nevada
Drinking establishments in Nevada
MGM Grand Las Vegas
Las Vegas